Callophrys polios, the hoary elfin, is a butterfly of the family Lycaenidae. It has a very local distribution in the United States from Maine south to New Jersey and in the Appalachian Mountains to Virginia, west across the Great Lakes states and the southern prairie provinces and north to Alaska. Along the Pacific Coast it is found to northern California and in the Rocky Mountains south to northern New Mexico. It is listed as a species of special concern and believed extirpated in the US state of Connecticut.

The wingspan is 22–29 mm. The upperside is orangish brown and the underside brown. The forewing outer margin is frosted white and has an irregular postmedian line, which is white. The outer half of the hindwing is frosted light gray. Adults are on wing from April to June in one generation.  
The larvae feed on Arctostaphylos uva-ursi and possibly Epigaea repens.  The adults feed on flower nectar from various species, including leatherleaf, pyxie, wild strawberry and willow. 
Hibernation takes place as a chrysalid.

Subspecies
Callophrys polios polios
Callophrys polios obscura Ferris & Fisher, 1973 (Colorado)
Callophrys polios maritima Emmel, Emmel & Mattoon, 1998 (California)

References

Callophrys
Butterflies of North America
Butterflies described in 1907